Santa Fe High School is a high school serving grades 9–12 from the Alachua-High Springs area in the northwestern part of Alachua County, Florida. It is located in Alachua, Florida and a part of the Alachua County Public Schools.

History

The consolidated Santa Fe High School was conceived in 1954 to replace schools in High Springs, Newberry and Alachua. The school opened in 1956.
The school mascot was originally the Rebels, but was later changed to the Raiders in 1970 when the school was integrated by federal court order. The school colors are red and gray.

SFHS Boys Soccer Team
The Santa Fe Boys Varsity Soccer Team has won a total of five district championships in 2015, 2016, 2018, 2019 and 2021.ss

With a win against Wakulla High School, the Santa Fe High School Boys Varsity team secured their fifth District Championship. This win secured the top spot for Florida's 2020-2021 Class 4A, District 2.

SFHS Marching Band and Football
The "Raider Regiment" marching band has won eight state championships, five consecutively from 1999 to 2003, then again in 2005, 2009 and 2010.

The Santa Fe Raiders Football Team has won two state championships, 1991 and 1994.

SFHS Girls Volleyball 
The Santa Fe Girls Volleyball team won the 2021 FHSAA 4A State Championship.

Notable alumni 
Gina Crews, graduated in 1991; starred in Survivor Marquesas 2002
Lenny DiNardo, graduated in 1998, was a member of the 2004 World Series Champion Boston Red Sox
Craig Fugate, Director of the Federal Emergency Management Administration (FEMA)
Tracy Ham, graduated in 1982; retired Canadian Football League player; inducted into the NCAA Football Hall of Fame in 2007 
Linval Joseph, graduated in 2007; defensive tackle second-round draft pick in the 2010 NFL Draft
Adrian N. Peterson, Chicago Bears running back 
Mike Peterson, Atlanta Falcons middle linebacker 
Shea Showers, football player
Freddie Solomon, (American football, born 1972)
Kirby Snead, pitcher for Toronto Blue Jays

References 

High schools in Alachua County, Florida
Public high schools in Florida